Atul Kapoor (born 28 December 1966 in Mumbai) is an Indian actor and voice actor who can speak English, Punjabi and Hindi.

He mostly has worked with dubbing foreign content into the Hindi language as part of his voice-acting career. He started off in 2002 before he made a big breakthrough in his career by voicing Bigg Boss on Sony Entertainment Television in 2006 and on Colors from 2008.

Filmography

Live action television series

Dubbing roles

Live action television series

Animated series

Live action films

Animated films

See also
List of Indian dubbing artists

References

1966 births
Male actors in Hindi cinema
21st-century Indian male actors
Indian male voice actors
Living people
Male actors from Mumbai